or  is an island in Skjervøy Municipality in Troms og Finnmark county, Norway. The island of Arnøya is immediately to the west of Laukøya, the Kvænangen fjord lies to the east, and the islands of Kågen and Skjervøya lie to the south. There is a regular ferry connection between Laukøya, Kågen, and Arnøya, but no road connections.

See also
 List of islands of Norway by area
 List of islands of Norway

References

Skjervøy
Islands of Troms og Finnmark